Lysator is an academic computer club at Linköping University, Sweden with almost 600 members. It is an independent non-profit society, separate from the students' union and the faculties of the university.

History 

Lysator was founded on 29 March 1973. The first computer used at Lysator was a Datasaab D21, delivered to Lysator on 25 May 1973. Later in the decade, members of Lysator developed and initially built a microcomputer, the LYS-16, which was advanced for its time due to its 16-bit word size.

In February 1993, Lysator put up the first web server in Sweden, among the first 10–15 in the world.

On 30 July 2010, Lysator began migrating to a new 3U home rack, increasing their available storage space from 700GB to 13TB.

Projects hosted by Lysator 

Lysator has been a starting ground for many notable projects, some of which have since become independent from the club:
 Project Runeberg
 LysKOM
 Elfwood
 SvenskMud
 NannyMUD
 Sprite Animation Toolkit
 Pike (programming language)

See also 
 History of the Internet in Sweden

References

External links 
 Homepage of Lysator
 History of Lysator
 

Linköping University
MUD organizations
Student organizations established in 1973
Computer clubs in Sweden